The Kerċem Ajax Stadium is a stadium located in Kerċem, Gozo, Malta. The stadium is believed to seat around 1,000 people and hosts the Gozo Football League Second Division and domestic cup matches.

Background and description
The stadium was inaugurated on 3 October 2014 and was part of an estimated €6 million investment made by the Malta Football Association with the help of the Government in completing ten infrastructural projects in Malta.The stadium comprises one stand, which is accessible from Wenzu Mintoff Street. The stand seats around 1,000 people and is host to a number of facilities, including dressing rooms, a clinic and a rehabilitation pool and a VIP room.

The Raymond Mercieca Sports Complex
The stadium makes part of the Raymond Mercieca Sports Complex, which was upgraded back in 2007 at a cost of Lm17,000. Besides the stadium, the complex includes a five-a-side pitch, a tennis court and two bocci pitches. As at 2017, the tennis court has fallen in a state of despair and is now being used as a parking.

See also

List of football stadiums in Malta

References

Football in Gozo
Football venues in Malta
Kerċem
2014 establishments in Malta
Sports venues completed in 2014